Hajar Bachhor Dhore also (English: Symphony of Agony) is a Bangladeshi Bengali-language film. It was released in 2005 throughout Bangladesh. It was directed by Kohinur Akter Suchanda. Based on Bangladeshi novelist and film maker Zahir Raihan's most popular novel Hajar Bochhor Dhore, it stars Riaz, newcomer Shoshi, Shahnoor, Kohinur Akter Suchanda, ATM Shamsuzzaman and many more.

Hajar Bachhor Dhore was highly appreciated by film critics and film viewers and won National Film Awards for best film award and in six other categories. The film was also awarded by Meril Prothom Alo Awards with the best film award with three categories.

Plot
The story begins years ago with Kashem.  He was rich and not lacking of anything except a child.  His wife finally requests that he marry again so that he can have children.  His wife marries him to a younger woman and then kills herself that night by eating a poisonous flower.  This began the tradition of polygamy in this family.

Years pass and that very house where Kashem lived in is now inhabited by the elderly Makbul, his little brother Montu, his cousins and his 3 wives live.  His youngest wife Tuni is but a teenager. She is in love with her husband's younger brother Montu and Montu also has feelings for her, but they are bound by their love for Makbul.

Montu is also loved by his neighbor Ambia.  Everyone notices and makes fun on Montu and Ambia, which angers Tuni.  One day Ambia's entire family is wiped out by a disease.  No one goes to bury the bodies for fear of catching the disease.  But the kind-hearted Montu defies all to bury the bodies and shows great compassion towards Ambia.

Makbul decides to marry Ambia to Montu so that his family can take over all of Ambia's property.  Tuni is against this and devises a plan to stop Montu's marriage to Ambia.  She convinces Makbul that he should take Ambia as his 4th wife.  Then all of the property would be his saying that every man should have 4 wives.  Makbul is convinced.

When Makbul tells his family his plans to marry Ambia, his family is infuriated.  His wives begin crying in protest and argue that he is too old to marry again. They refuse to give permission to marry.  His cousins also protest.  Tuni fuels his fire from behind him.  Finally in anger he divorces is first two wives.  His cousin throws a rock at his head.  He becomes sick from the wound.  His older two wives leave to their houses crying, since they do not have any reason to stay.  His second wife's brother angrily claims that he will marry his sister to a much wealthier man soon.

Soon Makbul dies leaving Tuni all by herself.  She is considered his only widow as he divorced his first two wives before he died.  Tuni is consumed with guilt as she feels that all of this happened because of her.  When Montu sees her wearing the white sari of a widow, he asks her to marry him as she can't stand to see her in such a state.  But she tells him that this is her punishment as she caused this downfall of an entire family.

The story flashes back to years in the future where they show that Montu and Ambia have wed.  Then they show Tuni is now an elderly widow living out her life in solitude.

A minor story arc shows Makbul's younger cousin who has beat two wives to death already.  He mercilessly beats his third wife and when Montu protests he is told to mind his own business as he has no right to tell anyone how to treat their wife.  One day Montu sees her attempting to commit suicide, but then she does not.  He is astounded by a human beings willingness to live no matter how hard their life is.  One day when Montu returns from a trip he finds out that the third wife has also been beaten to death.  At the end when Makbul is telling the family he wants to marry Ambia, the cousin says that since he does not have a wife he will marry Ambia, to which Tuni replies that he would just beat her to death as well.

Cast
 Riaz as Montu
 Shoshi as Tuni
 Shahnoor as Ambia
 ATM Shamsuzzaman as Mokbul
 Kohinur Akter Suchanda as Tuni's Mother
 Nazma Anwar 
 Siraj Haider as Abul
 Amir Siraji as Guno Molla
 Shahidul Alam Sachchu as Monowar Haji
 Anisur Rahman Milon as Karim Sheikh

Music 
Hajar Bachhor Dhore the film was music directed and composed by Ahmed Imtiaz Bulbul. But a song first part lyrics by Zahir Raihan, song as Asha Chhilo Mone Mone..

Sound track

Awards and achievements

International Awards

National Film Awards
Hajar Bachhor Dhore the film won best film in 2005 as well as six other categories in the National Film Awards of Bangladesh.

 Winner Best Film, Suchanda Chalachitra 2005
 Winner Best Director, Kohinur Akter Suchanda 2005
 Winner Best Music Director, Ahmed Imtiaz Bulbul 2005
 Winner Best Story, Zahir Raihan (Posthumous) 2005
 Winner Best Cinemagrapher (Color), Mahfuzur Rahman Khan 2005
 Winner Best Art Director, Mohammad Kolamtor 2005

BACHASAS Film Awards
Hajar Bachhor Dhore the film was gets won BACHASAS Film Awards of Bangladesh best Female Playback Singer in the year 2005.

 Winner Best Female Playback Singer, Anupoma Mukti 2005

Meril-Prothom Alo Awards
Hajar Bachhor Dhore the film won in three categories at the Meril Prothom Alo Awards in 2005.

 Winner Best Film, Suchanda Chalachitra 2005
 Winner Best Director, Kohinur Akter Suchanda 2005
 Winner Best Actor, Riaz 2005
 Winner Best Actress, Shashi 2005

References

External links
 

2005 films
2005 drama films
Bengali-language Bangladeshi films
Bangladeshi drama films
Films based on Bangladeshi novels
Films scored by Ahmed Imtiaz Bulbul
2000s Bengali-language films
 
Best Film National Film Award (Bangladesh) winners